Dame Rosalind Joy Savill, DBE, FSA, FBA (born 12 May 1951) is a British art and museum curator.

An alumna of the University of Leeds, Savill was first employed at the Victoria and Albert Museum as a canteen cashier. Later she was named Museum Assistant at the Wallace Collection, where she was appointed as Assistant to the Director in 1978. In April 1988, Savill's The Wallace Collection Catalogue of Sèvres Porcelain was published in three volumes, which took her a decade to compile.

In 1990 she was awarded the National Art Collection Fund prize for her scholarship. In 2000 she was appointed CBE for her services to the study of ceramics. In 1992 she was named Director of the Wallace Collection. She retired from that post in 2011. In 2009 she was named Dame Commander of the Order of the British Empire.

Affiliations
 National Trust Art's Panel, Member
 Art Advisory Committee, National Museums and Galleries of Wales
 Royal Mint Advisory Committee
 Museums and Collections Advisory Committee, English Heritage
 Somerset House, trustee 
 Campaign for Museums
 Camden School for Girls, Governor
 French Porcelain Society, President

References

1951 births
Living people
British art historians
Women art historians
British curators
British non-fiction writers
Dames Commander of the Order of the British Empire
Fellows of the British Academy
Fellows of the Society of Antiquaries of London
People associated with the Wallace Collection
Alumni of the University of Leeds
People associated with the Victoria and Albert Museum
British women curators